Acacia matthewii  is a species of wattle native to central New South Wales.

References

matthewii
Flora of New South Wales